The 1909 Dartmouth football team was an American football team that represented Dartmouth College as an independent during the 1909 college football season. In its first and only season under head coach W. H. Lillard, the team compiled a 5–1–2 record, shut out six of eight opponents, and outscored all opponents by a total of 89 to 18. Clark Tobin was the team captain.

Schedule

References

Dartmouth
Dartmouth Big Green football seasons
Dartmouth football